Yessenia Estefani Huenteo Cheuquemán (born 30 October 1992) is a Chilean footballer who plays as a right winger for Universidad de Chile and the Chile women's national team.

International career
Huenteo represented Chile at the 2012 South American U-20 Women's Championship.

Honours

Club
Colo-Colo
Chilean women's football championship (8): 2013 Apertura, 2013 Clausura, 2014 Apertura, 2014 Clausura, 2015 Apertura, 2016 Clausura, 2017 Apertura, 2017 Clausura

Personal life
Huenteo is of Mapuche descent.

In November 2016, Huenteo starred in Somos Chile (We are Chile), a web series created by the ANFP which reflects the process of multiculturalism that Chile has been going through that decade, in hopes to combat forms of discrimination such as racism and xenophobia. In the series, Huenteo declared herself proud of her mapuche heritage, but at the same time felt ashamed when receiving racist chants by some supporters.

References

External links
Yessenia Huenteo at BDFútbol

1992 births
Living people
Footballers from Santiago
Chilean women's footballers
Women's association football wingers
Audax Italiano footballers
Colo-Colo (women) footballers
Segunda Federación (women) players
Chile women's international footballers
Competitors at the 2014 South American Games
South American Games medalists in football
South American Games silver medalists for Chile
2019 FIFA Women's World Cup players
Chilean expatriate women's footballers
Chilean expatriate sportspeople in Spain
Expatriate women's footballers in Spain
Chilean people of Mapuche descent